The 2014–15 Washington Capitals season was the 41st season for the National Hockey League franchise that was established on June 11, 1974.

Off-season
Less than two weeks after the end of the Capitals' 2013–14 season, where the team missed the playoffs for the first time since 2007, the Washington Capitals announced that Head Coach Adam Oates was fired and general manager George McPhee would not have his contract with the team renewed. On May 26, 2014, the Capitals promoted Brian MacLellan to be senior vice president and general manager and named Barry Trotz their new head coach.

In July 2014, the Capitals signed several free agents, including former Pittsburgh Penguins defensemen Matt Niskanen and Brooks Orpik.

Playoffs

The Washington Capitals entered the playoffs as the Metropolitan Division's second seed. They defeated the New York Islanders in the first round, and were defeated by the New York Rangers in the second round.

Standings

Schedule and results

Pre-season

Regular season

Playoffs

Player statistics
Final stats
Skaters

Goaltenders

†Denotes player spent time with another team before joining the Capitals. Stats reflect time with the Capitals only.
‡Denotes player was traded mid-season. Stats reflect time with the Capitals only.
Bold/italics denotes franchise record.

Notable achievements

Awards

Milestones

Transactions
The Capitals have been involved in the following transactions during the 2014–15 season.

Trades

Free agents acquired

Free agents lost

Claimed via waivers

Lost via waivers

Player signings

Suspensions/fines

Draft picks

The 2014 NHL Entry Draft will be held on June 27–28, 2014, at the Wells Fargo Center in Philadelphia, Pennsylvania.

Notes
 The Buffalo Sabres' second-round pick (from the Minnesota Wild originally from the Winnipeg Jets) went to the Washington Capitals as a result of a June 28, 2014 trade that sent a 2014 second-round pick and 2014 third-round pick to the Sabres in exchange for this pick.
 The Washington Capitals' second-round pick went to the Buffalo Sabres as a result of a June 28, 2014 trade that sent a 2014 second-round pick (from the Minnesota Wild originally from the Winnipeg Jets) to the Capitals exchange for a 2014 third-round pick and this pick.
 The Washington Capitals' third-round pick went to the Buffalo Sabres as a result of a June 28, 2014 trade that sent a 2014 second-round pick (from the Minnesota Wild originally from the Winnipeg Jets) to the Capitals exchange for a 2014 second-round pick and this pick.
 The New York Rangers' third-round pick went to the Washington Capitals as a result of a June 28, 2014 trade that sent two 2014 fourth-round picks to the Rangers in exchange for this pick.
 The Washington Capitals' fourth-round pick went to the New York Rangers as a result of a June 28, 2014 trade that sent a 2014 third-round pick to the Capitals exchange for a 2014 fourth-round pick (from the New York Islanders originally from the Chicago Blackhawks) and this pick.
 The Winnipeg Jets' sixth-round pick went to the Washington Capitals as a result of a June 28, 2014 trade that sent a 2014 sixth-round pick, a 2014 seventh-round pick (from the Nashville Predators) and a 2015 seventh-round pick to the Jets in exchange for Edward Pasquale  and this pick.
 The Washington Capitals' sixth-round pick went to the Winnipeg Jets as a result of a June 28, 2014 trade that sent Edward Pasquale and a 2014 sixth-round pick to the Capitals exchange for a 2014 seventh-round pick (from the Nashville Predators) and a 2015 seventh-round pick and this pick.

References

Washington
Washington Capitals season, 2014-15
Washington Capitals seasons
Cap
Cap